Ros Serey Sothea (/ ; c. 1948 – c. 1977) was a Cambodian singer. She was active during the final years of the First Kingdom of Cambodia and into the Khmer Republic period. She sang in a variety of genres; romantic ballads emerged as her most popular works. Despite a relatively brief career she is credited with singing hundreds of songs. She also ventured into acting, starring in a few films. Details of her life are relatively scarce. She disappeared during the Khmer Rouge regime of the late 1970s but the circumstances of her fate remain a mystery. Norodom Sihanouk granted Sothea the honorary title "Queen with the Golden Voice."

Biography

Early life
Ros Sothea was born in circa 1948 to Ros Bun and Nath Samien in Battambang Province. Growing up relatively poor on a farm, Ros Sothea was the second youngest of five children; her older sister Ros Saboeut later became known as an activist. She displayed vocal talent as a toddler and grew up listening to early Cambodian pop singers like Mao Sareth and Chhoun Malay. Sothea's talent would remain relatively hidden until friends persuaded her to join a regional singing contest in 1963. After winning the contest she became widely known in her home province and was invited to join a musical troupe that regularly performed at Stung Khiev restaurant in Battambang; she also performed in a family band with her brother Serey. It is believed that Im Song Seurm, a singer from the National Radio service, heard of Sothea's talents and invited her to Phnom Penh in 1967.

Music career
In Phnom Penh, she adopted the alias Ros Serey Sothea and became a singer for the National Radio service, first performing duets with Im Song Seurm. Her first hit, "Stung Khieu (Blue River)" appeared in 1967 and she quickly became popular across Cambodia, particularly for her high and clear voice. Eventually she became a regular partner with Sinn Sisamouth, the era's leading singer, resulting in many popular duet recordings. She also collaborated with other prominent singers of the era like Pen Ran, Huoy Meas, and Sos Mat, while maintaining an active solo career as well.

Sothea's early recordings were largely traditional Cambodian ballads. She would eventually adopt a more contemporary style incorporating French and American influences, adding western pop/rock instrumentation, as was common in Cambodian music starting in the late 1960s. Eventually Sothea and her contemporaries were strongly influenced by American radio that had been transmitted to U.S. troops in nearby South Vietnam, inspiring experimentation with American/British rock and soul sounds. Sothea combined her high and clear voice with backing provided by young rock musicians, characterized by prominent electric guitars, drums, and Farfisa organs. This resulted in a sound that is often described as psychedelic or garage rock, and Sothea became the leading female singer in the thriving Cambodian rock scene. Sothea was also one of many singers in that scene to create new versions of popular western rock songs with Khmer lyrics, such as "Cry Loving Me" (based on "Proud Mary" by Creedence Clearwater Revival) and "Wolly Polly" (based on "Wooly Bully" by Sam the Sham).

Romantic ballads would remain her most endearing work amongst the more conservative populace. She was often sought out by film directors to perform songs in their movies. Sothea's collaboration with the Cambodian film industry is invaluable in identifying over 250 films lost during the Khmer Rouge regime. Sothea never sang under any one record label and made a modest living as a musician. She was recognized as a national treasure and was honored by Head of State Norodom Sihanouk with the royal title of Preah Reich Theany Somlang Meas, the "Queen with the Golden Voice" (sometimes translated as "Golden Voice of the Royal Capital"). During the Cambodian Civil War in the early 1970s, Sothea became involved in the Khmer Republic military and recorded patriotic songs supporting the Republic's stance against the Khmer Rouge insurgents. Her career would continue until the Khmer Rouge captured Phnom Penh in April 1975.

Personal life

Little information about Ros Serey Sothea's personal life has survived, though her personality has been described as modest and reserved. She is known to have been involved in a few high-profile relationships. As documented in the film Don't Think I've Forgotten, when she arrived in Phnom Penh she was courted by fellow singer Sos Mat and they eventually married. As Sothea's career moved forward, Sos Mat became jealous of her success and of the men who came to watch her perform, culminating in physical abuse. Sothea fled the marriage within six months and obtained a divorce. Believing that her career would be ruined by the stigma of divorce, Sothea went back to her family in Battambang but was convinced by Sinn Sisamouth to return to Phnom Penh and resume her career.

Sothea's popularity rebounded and she met a prominent member of a film-making family while recording film songs. This relationship led to marriage and the birth of a son, but for undocumented reasons the marriage was short-lived. The film Don't Think I've Forgotten also reports that Sothea had a relationship with an officer in the Khmer Republic army and learned to be a paratrooper during the Cambodian Civil War, though her boyfriend is believed to have been killed in combat. This relationship increased her participation with the military; a film of Sothea parachuting out of a plane during a paratrooper exercise is the only known video footage of her to have survived. Fans believe that Sothea's unhappy relationships were a primary influence on her singing style and lyrics, indicated by song titles (in translation) like "Don't Be Mad," "Brokenhearted Woman," and "Wicked Husband."

Disappearance and death
Ros Serey Sothea disappeared during the Khmer Rouge genocide and her exact fate has never been confirmed, with multiple sources making contradictory claims. For example, her sisters have alleged that Sothea is likely to have died immediately after the Khmer Rouge seized control of Cambodia in April 1975; as a famous entertainer with "western" influences, qualities widely known to be disdained by the Khmer Rouge, she would have been targeted for imprisonment or execution immediately. Her whereabouts at the time are also uncertain, with some sources claiming that she had traveled to Pailin Province for the 1975 Buddhist New Year, as the lyrics of her final recordings are on that topic, though others are skeptical of this claim because of the dangers of traveling in Cambodia during that period. She may have also been in Phnom Penh at the time and was forced to evacuate like all other residents, and some sources also claim that the outgoing government made efforts to get her out of the country.

Further sources claim that Sothea, like most city dwellers, was relocated to the Cambodian countryside for farm work; having grown up on a farm she was able to adjust to the work and hide her identity for a time. According to this story, she was eventually discovered, after which she was forced by Pol Pot to marry one of his officers and perform regularly for the party leadership. This story contends that her marriage to the officer was abusive and the party leadership determined that her presence was too controversial, so she was allegedly led away and executed in 1977.

Yet more sources claim that Sothea died from overwork in a Khmer Rouge agricultural camp, or that she survived until the Vietnamese invasion of late 1978/early 1979 but soon died in a hospital from malnutrition. Whatever the cause, Sothea almost certainly died during the Khmer Rouge regime but her remains have never been discovered.

Legacy

Many of Ros Serey Sothea's master recordings were either destroyed by the Khmer Rouge regime in its efforts to eliminate foreign influences from Cambodian society, or deteriorated rapidly in the tropical environment. However, many vinyl records have survived and have been reissued on cassette or compact disc. Many of the reissued recordings contained overdubs of drum machines and keyboards, and were sometimes sped up. Thus, the original recordings by Sothea and her contemporaries are highly sought by collectors and preservationists.

Sothea's older sister Ros Saboeut is widely credited with reuniting Cambodia's surviving musicians and bands in the aftermath of the Khmer Rouge era. Surviving musicians had initially contacted Ros Saboeut to inquire about Sothea's fate; Saboeut used the opportunity to reunite the survivors. According to Youk Chhang, the executive director of the Documentation Center of Cambodia, Ros Saboeut sought to restore Cambodian music as a tribute to her sister, saying "I think she was bound by the legacy of her sister to help." Her efforts were widely credited with rebuilding the country's rock genre.

Ros Serey Sothea has remained extremely popular posthumously in Cambodia and Cambodian communities scattered throughout the United States, France, Australia, and Canada. Western listeners were introduced to her work starting in the late 1990s with the release of the Cambodian Rocks bootleg album, followed by the soundtrack to the film City of Ghosts. The Los Angeles band Dengue Fever, featuring Cambodian lead singer Chhom Nimol, covers a number of songs by Sothea and her contemporaries in the Cambodian rock scene, as does the band Cambodian Space Project. Sothea was the subject of the 2006 short film The Golden Voice, in which she is played by actress Sophea Pel. Ros Serey Sothea is also profiled extensively in the 2015 documentary film Don't Think I've Forgotten, in which several interview subjects describe her as one of the most important singers in the history of Cambodian popular music.

Partial discography

Rock
 "Chnam Oun Dap Pram Muoy" (I'm 16)
 "Cry Loving Me"
 "Don't Be Mad"
 "Hair Cut, Hair Cut"
 "Have You Seen My Love"
 "I'm So Shy"
 "Phey! Phey!" (Scared! Scared!)
 "Since When You Knew Me"
 "Wait Ten Months" (Jam 10 Kai Theit / "Wait 10 Months More")
 "Wicked Husband"
 "Mdech ka dar tam knyom?" (Why do you follow me?)
 "Khlin joep nersa" (The fragrant that lasts with me)
 "Rom Woolly Bully"
 "Bong Srolań Oun Ponman Dae" (Tell Me How Much You Love Me)
 "Po Preuk Po Lngeach"
 "Penh Chet Tae Bong Muoy" (A Go Go)
"Komlos Sey Chaom" (Love God)
Jas Bong Ju Am
Penh Chet Tae Bong Mouy (I Love Only You)

Romvong
 "Kaduk Dol Heuy"
 "Komping Puoy"
 "Rolum Saen Kraw"
 "Sarika Keo Kauch"
 "Tha Cho Chok"
 "Or! Champey Euy"
 "Leour So Skol Thoun"
 "Kae Rognea Heuy Me"
 "Pkah Lmeath"
 "Chong Ban Chea Kou Veasna"

Saravann
 "Sra Muy Keo" (One Shot)

Slow
 "kaun komsott"
 "Bopha Akasajal"
 "Jomno Pailin"
 "Kom Plich Oun Na"
 "New Year's Eve"
 "Pink Night"
 "Pga Reige Leu Maik"
 "Pruos Reing Awej?"
 "Lort sene duong chan"
 "Chross O'yadao"
 "Somnerng Bopha prey phnom" (Songs of the jungle girl)
 "Sralmall sene khyum" (Shadow of my love)
 "Chmreing sene khyum" (Story of my love)
 "Alay bong cher net" (Always misses you)
 "Teurk hoe teu" (River flow)
 "Bong ban sonyah" (You've promise)
 "Soum ros khbere bong"
 "Oun soum angvor" (I beg of you)
 "Oun neul tharl rong jum" (I will still wait)
 "Bomplej men ban" (Can't forget)
 "Oun smak bong smoss"
 "Oun sralnane bong nas" (I love you so much)
 "San nuk alay"
 "Men guor sralane bong" (I shouldn't love you)
 "Chup sralane men ban" (Can't stop loving you)
 "Jum neu tharl jum"
 "Oun jum bong cher neth"
 "Phnom Kong'rei" (Phnom Kong Rei)
 "Pros bondoll chiet"
 "Kum keng oun na bong"
 "Rom cha cha cha"
 "Jum loss sone"
 "Bong tver oy oun yum" (You made me cry)
 "Yume samrap thngay nis"
 "Sall anosaovary"
 "Leng knhom tv" (Let me go)
 "Bondam stung keiv"
 "Reastrei buth sene" (Missing lover of the night)
 "Pkah orchid"
 "Auh! seneha khnom"
 "Verjah boross" (The word of men)
 "Popol gomah"
 "Prot svamei"
 "Oun soum phneu chheung"
 "San klotpsa"
 "Chhba mon reing khyum"
 "Norok lokei" (The sin of man)
 "Ahso kasalmerlerr"
 "Rolok songka therm svamei"
 "Thmnorng leakina"
 "Thgnay lett oun sralnoss" (When sunset, I miss u)
 "Tropeang Peay"
 "San chok chem"
 "Pathchere sralnoss"
 "Konseng nisei"
 "Machass sne oun"
 "Jomreang avasan"
 Konsaeng Krohom" (Red Scarf)
 Bros Del K'bot Chet" (Man who betrays)
 Veal Srae Sronos"

Duets with Sinn Sisamouth

 "Ae Na Promajarey"
 "Bong Ban Khernh Sre"
 "Bos Choong"
 "Chom Chait Pesaey"
 "Chao Luoch Jet"
 "Have a Caramel"
 "Jang ban pka avey?" (What flower do you want?)
 "Kay Tha Knyom Jass"
 "Kamnap snaeha" (Love poem)
 "Komnoch veyo"
 "Pneik Kamhuoch"
 "Niw Tae Srolanh"
 "Oh! snaeha euy!" (Oh! Love...)
 "Oun Rom Som Te?"
 "Sranah Ou chrow"
 "Soniya 3 Tngai" (A Promise for 3 Days)
 "Tehsepheap Prolim"
 "Tiev Euy Srey Tiev"
 "Tmor Kol Sromol Snae"
 "Tok Bong Om Skat"
 "Yaop Yun Thun Trojeak"
 "Yerng Kom Plich Khnea"

Duets with Other Artists
 "Khmao Euy Khmao" (with Em Song Seum-1972)
 "Kamloh Kramom Heu Ha" (with Em Song Seum-1972)
 "Kamloh Kramom Srok Srae"
 "Hann Pnal Da Ey" (with Eng Nary)
 "Soll Tae Card"
 "Pka Sarai"
 "Srolanh Sok Krong (with Chea Savoeun)

References

External links
 The Golden Voice, short film about Ros Sereysothea by Greg Cahill
 Don't Think I've Forgotten – A documentary about the Khmer rock and roll scene.
 Ros Sereysothea – Biography, Videos, Music, Pictures – A fan site.

20th-century Cambodian women singers
Cambodian actresses
1948 births
1977 deaths
People who died in the Cambodian genocide
Khmer people
People from Battambang province